Robert Smith (born 24 October 1974) is an Australian-born former cricketer who played in New Zealand. He played six first-class and two List A matches for Otago between 2001 and 2002.

See also
 List of Otago representative cricketers

References

External links
 

1974 births
Living people
New Zealand cricketers
Otago cricketers
Cricketers from Sydney